Maria Wasti (born August 14, 1980) is a Pakistani film, television actress and host. She currently hosts the game show Croron Mein Khel on the Pakistani television channel BOL Entertainment.

Biography

Early years
Maria Wasti was born in Dar Es Salaam, Tanzania. She spent her early years there before moving to Pakistan with her family. She is the niece of Rizwan Wasti and Tahira Wasti. Wasti's parents wanted her to be a doctor, but she preferred a career in entertainment. At the time, the only television network active in the country was the government-owned Pakistan Television Corporation (PTV). It would be later in the 1990s that Network Television Marketing (NTM), the country's first privately owned channel, showcased content specifically targeted to the young generation and Wasti became interested in acting.

First teleplay
In the mid-1990s, Wasti was approached by Bakhtiar Ahmed, the programme manager of PTV Lahore Centre, to be cast in a play called Sarah Aur Ammara alongside Resham, a film actress. The teleplay highlighted a story about two sisters going through the turmoil of arranged marriages. She has since done over 50 serials and around the same number of assorted plays.

Acting as a career
Wasti recalls that her first experience in acting was for the passion of art, but later her parents told her to pursue the career in a professional manner. After her first stint, Wasti began receiving roles in various other plays in Lahore, Karachi and Islamabad centres for PTV. She reminisces that people were sceptical when she stepped into acting, but once she proved herself they started accepting her.

She considers Bano Qudsia and Kallo among her most memorable plays. In other equally applauded roles, she played a victim in Baadlon Par Basera, who is forcefully led into marriage with a man in the United States on the phone and when she meets him for the first time, she realises the man is older than the picture she saw him in.

Wasti is usually seen playing unglamorous roles involving sensitive issues regarding women in Pakistan. She has played roles depicting prominent women like Salma Murad and Bilquis Edhi.
Wasti is known for being outspoken on various of issues like women's rights, harassment, gender equality and prejudice.

Recent ventures
Wasti has expressed that newer Pakistani plays should portray issues in today's Pakistan. She names drugs and AIDS being amongst the most sensitive. She also cites the reason for the decrease in the quality of drama serials as being the lack of a supply of actors, actresses, writers, directors and producers.

In view of these thoughts, Wasti opened a production house in 2002, where she has successfully produced several serials and a dozen plays.

Filmography

Television
{| class="wikitable sortable plainrowheaders"
|- style="text-align:center;"
! scope="col"|Year
! scope="col"|Title
! scope="col"|Notes
|-
|1997
| Aashiana
|
|-
| rowspan="3" |1999
|Sarah Aur Ammara
|
|-
| Ahsaas
|
|-
|Boota from Toba Tek Singh
|
|-
| rowspan="3" |2001
|Baadlon Par Basera
|
|-
|Dharkan
|
|-
|Sheeshay Ka Mehal
|
|-
| rowspan="2" |2004
|Moorat
|Nominated–Lux Style Awards for Best TV Actress
|-
|Aangan Bhar Chandni
|
|-
|2005
|Riyasat
|Lux Style Awards for Best Actress
|-
| rowspan="2" |2006
| Neend
|
|-
|Kuch Dil Ne Kaha
|Nominated–Lux Style Awards for Best TV Actress
|-
|2007
| Thori door Saath Chalo
|
|-
| rowspan="2" |2008
|Khandaan
|
|-
|Kaun
|
|-
| rowspan="3" |2009
| Tere Liye
|
|-
|Kuch Ankahi Baatain
|
|-
|Buri Aurat
|
|-
| rowspan="4" |2010
|Dil
|
|-
|Woh Chaar
|Episode 8, 11
|-
|Aey Ishq Hamain Barbad Na Ker
|
|-
|Diya Jalay
|
|-
| rowspan="5" |2011
| Love Kay Liye
|
|-
| Ruswa
|
|-
|Aurat Ka Ghar Konsa
|Nominated–PTV Awards for Best Actress
|-
|Akhri Barish
|
|-
|Kaali Aankhain
|
|-
| rowspan="5" |2012
|Behkawa
|
|-
|Sasural Ke Rang Anokhay
|Episode 7
|-
|Kitni Girhain Baqi Hain
|Various Episodes
|-
|Band Baje Ga
|
|-
|Barish Kay Ansoo
|
|-
| rowspan="4" |2013
|Kahani Eik Raat Ki
|Episode 15
|-
|Kabhi Kabhi
|
|-
|Rehaai
|Nominated–Hum Awards for Best Supporting Actress
|-
|Kalmoohi
|
|-
|2013
|Meri Ladli
|
|-
| rowspan="2" |2014
|Diya Jaley
|
|-
|Malika-e-Aliya
|
|-
| rowspan="5" |2015
| Tujh Pe Qurban
|
|-
|Khoat
|
|-
|Bojh
|
|-
|Kaise Huaye Benaam
|
|-
|Jalebiyan
|Noor Jahan
|-
| rowspan="2" |2016
| Teri Chah Mein
|
|-
| Kitni Girhain Baaki Hain (Season 2) 
|Episode "Tasawwur", "Garhasti"
|-
| rowspan="3" |2017
|Malkin
|
|-
| Jab Hatheli Per Chand Likhna
|
|-
| Dhund
|
|-
| rowspan="6" |2018
|Babban Khala Ki Betiyaan
|
|-
|Court Room
|
|-
|Naik Parveen
|
|-
| Siskiyaan
|
|-
|Ustani Jee
|Episode 14, 15
|-
| Aik Aur Sitam
|
|-
| rowspan="3" |2019
|Cheekh
|Special appearance in promo
|-
|Bhook
|
|-
|Croron Mein Khel
|Reality show Host
|-
| rowspan="3" |2020
|Shehr-e-Malaal
|
|-
|Game Show Aisay Chalay Ga|Game Show Aisay Chalay Ga League|Captain "Islamabad Eagles"
|-
|Dikhawa|Episode "Hamdard"
|-
|2022
|Aik Sitam Aur|Zainab
|}

Telefilm
 Kallo Parinda Ae Bhai Zara Dekh Kay Mama I Love You Survival of a Woman Parinda Ae Bhai Zara Dekh Kay Mama I Love You Survival of a Woman Ain (There Raj Main)
 Sunrise From IstanbulFilm
 Ramchand Pakistani, 2008 - KamlaLove Main Ghum Yarana'', 2009 - Pashto

Accolades

References

External links
 

Living people
Pakistani female models
Pakistani television actresses
Pakistani film actresses
Punjabi people
Actresses from Lahore
20th-century Pakistani actresses
21st-century Pakistani actresses
Pakistani expatriates in Tanzania
1965 births
PTV Award winners